The following is a list of films featuring horse racing.

List

See also
List of highest grossing sports films 
List of sports films

References

Films about animals playing sports
Horse racing